Derek Alexander Muller (born 9 November 1982) is an Australian-Canadian science communicator, filmmaker, and television personality, who is best known for his YouTube channel Veritasium, which has 13.5 million subscribers as of March 2023. Muller has also appeared as a correspondent on the Netflix web series Bill Nye Saves the World since 2017.

Early life and education 
Muller was born to South African parents in Traralgon, Victoria, Australia, and moved to Vancouver, British Columbia, Canada, when he was 18 months old. In 2000, Muller graduated from West Vancouver Secondary School. In 2004, Muller graduated from Queen's University in Kingston, Ontario, with a Bachelor of Applied Science in Engineering Physics.

Muller moved to Australia to study film-making, but instead enrolled for a Ph.D. in physics education research from the University of Sydney, which he completed in 2008 with a thesis: Designing Effective Multimedia for Physics Education. He was still looking for a creative career but did not find a direct path.

Career
Muller has been listed as a team member of the ABC's television program Catalyst since 2008.

During his Ph.D. course, he was also teaching in a tutoring company, where he took a full-time job as science head after he completed the course in 2008. He quit the job at the end of 2010.

In 2011 Muller created his YouTube channel "Veritasium" (see section below), which became his main source of livelihood in a few years.

Since 2011, Muller has continued to appear on Catalyst, reporting scientific stories from around the globe, and on Australian television network Ten as the 'Why Guy' on the Breakfast program. In May 2012, he gave a TEDxSydney talk using the subject of his thesis. He presented the documentary Uranium – Twisting the Dragon's Tail, which aired in July–August 2015 on several public television stations around the world and won the Eureka Prize for Science Journalism.

On 21 September 2015, Muller hosted the Google Science Fair Awards Celebration for that year.

Muller has also won the Australian Department of Innovation Nanotechnology Film Competition and the 2013 Australian Webstream Award for "Best Educational & Lifestyle Series".

Starting in April 2017, he appeared as a correspondent on the Netflix series Bill Nye Saves the World.

Muller presented in film Vitamania: The Sense and Nonsense of Vitamins, a documentary by Genepool Productions, released in August 2018. The film answers questions about vitamins and the use of dietary vitamin supplements.

Muller's works have been featured in Scientific American, Wired, Gizmodo, and i09.

Veritasium and other YouTube channels

In January 2011, Muller created the educational science channel Veritasium on YouTube, the focus of which is "addressing counter-intuitive concepts in science, usually beginning by discussing ideas with members of the public". The videos range in style from interviews with experts, such as 2011 Physics Nobel Laureate Brian Schmidt, to science experiments, dramatisations, songs, anda hallmark of the channelinterviews with the public to uncover misconceptions about science. The name Veritasium is a combination of the Latin word for truth, Veritas, and the suffix common to many elements, -ium. This creates Veritasium, an "element of truth", a play on the popular phrase and a reference to chemical elements. In its logo, which has been a registered trade mark since 2016, the number "42.0" resembles an element on the periodic table. The number was chosen as it is "The Answer to the Ultimate Question of Life, The Universe, and Everything" in Douglas Adams' famous novel.

In July 2012, Muller created a second YouTube channel, 2veritasium. Muller uses the new platform to produce editorial videos that discuss such topics as film making, showcasing behind-the-scenes footage, and for viewer reactions to popular Veritasium videos.

In 2017, Muller began uploading videos on his newest channel, Sciencium, which is dedicated to videos on recent and historical discoveries in science.

Reception
Veritasium videos have received critical acclaim.
Two early successful Veritasium videos demonstrate the physics of a falling Slinky toy.
At 2012 Science Online, the video "Mission Possible: Graphene" won the Cyberscreen Science Film Festival and was therefore featured on Scientific American as the video of the week. A video debunking the common misconception that the moon is closer than it is, was picked-up by CBS News.

After a video was posted in which Muller is shown driving a wind-powered car, equipped with a huge spinning propeller, faster than the wind, UCLA physics professor Alexander Kusenko disagreed with the claim that sailing downwind faster than wind was possible within the laws of physics, and made a scientific wager with Muller $10,000 that he could not demonstrate that the apparent greater speed was not due to other, incidental factors. Muller took up the bet, and the signing of a wager agreement by the parties was witnessed by Bill Nye and Neil deGrasse Tyson. In a subsequent video, Muller demonstrated the effect with a model cart under conditions ruling out extraneous effects. Kusenko conceded the bet.

Personal life and family
After Derek Muller's parents, Anthony and Shirley, married in South Africa, they moved to Vancouver, British Columbia, Canada, where his two sisters were born (Kirstie and Marilouise). The family moved to Australia, where he was born, after his father got a job in Traralgon at a pulp and paper mill. When he was 18 months old, the family moved back to Vancouver.

After Muller moved to Los Angeles he met Raquel Nuno, a planetary scientist whom he married. They have three children (2021).

See also
Kurzgesagt
CGP Grey
Tom Scott (presenter)

Footnotes

References

External links
 

Video bloggers
Online edutainment
Living people
1982 births
Australian emigrants to Canada
People from Traralgon
People from Vancouver
Queen's University at Kingston alumni
University of Sydney alumni
Australian Internet celebrities
Education-related YouTube channels
Science-related YouTube channels
Canadian people of South African descent
Australian people of South African descent